The 1964 edition of the Campeonato Carioca kicked off on July 4, 1964 and ended on December 13, 1964. It was organized by FCF (Federação Carioca de Futebol, or Carioca Football Federation). Thirteen teams participated. Fluminense won the title for the 18th time. Olaria, São Cristóvão, Madureira, Campo Grande and Canto do Rio were relegated.

System
The tournament would be disputed in a double round-robin format, with the team with the most points winning the title and the five teams with the fewest points being relegated.

Championship

Playoffs

References

Campeonato Carioca seasons
Carioca